Tore Meinecke (born 21 July 1967) is a former professional tennis player from West Germany.

Career
As a junior, Meinecke won the Orange Bowl doubles champion 16-under in 1982 (partnering Boris Becker) and was runner-up at the European Junior Championships (w/Becker). He turned pro in 1983. During his professional career, Meinecke won two doubles titles. He achieved a career-high singles ranking of world No. 46 in May 1988 and a career-high doubles ranking of No. 46 in July 1987.

In June 1989, Meinecke suffered a car crash in Clermont-Ferrand, France which put him in a coma for more than a month and forced him to retire from professional tennis at the age of 22.

He currently runs a tennis school near Geneva, Switzerland together with Jonas Svensson.

Career finals

Singles (1 loss)

Doubles (2 wins, 1 loss)

References

External links
 
 
 JOTO Tennis School

1967 births
Living people
Tennis players from Hamburg
West German male tennis players